Celso Ferreira (2 October 1950 – 14 January 1997), also known as Celsinho, was a Brazilian footballer who played as a forward. He competed in the men's tournament at the 1972 Summer Olympics.

References

External links
 

1950 births
1997 deaths
Footballers from São Paulo
Brazilian footballers
Association football forwards
Brazil international footballers
Olympic footballers of Brazil
Footballers at the 1972 Summer Olympics